Herbal distillates, also known as floral waters, hydrosols, hydrolates, herbal waters, and essential waters, are aqueous products of hydrodistillation. They are colloidal suspensions of essential oils as well as water-soluble components obtained by steam distillation or hydrodistillation (a variant of steam distillation) from plants and herbs. These herbal distillates have uses as flavorings and cosmetics. Common herbal distillates for skincare include rose water, orange flower water, and witch hazel. Rosemary, oregano, and thyme are hydrosols that may be used in food manufacturing.

Production 
Herbal distillates are produced in the same or similar manner as essential oils. However, essential oils will float to the top of the distillate where it is removed, leaving behind the watery distillate. For this reason the term essential water is an apt description. In the past, these essential waters were often considered a byproduct of distillation, but are now considered an important co-product. The produced herbal waters are essentially diluted essential oils at less than 1% concentration (typically 0.02% to 0.05%). Several factors, such as temperature and an herb's growth cycle, impact the characteristics of a distillate, and therefore influence the timing of the distillation. Rosemary, for example, should be distilled in the peak of summer before it flowers.

Usage 

Distillates are used as flavorings, cosmetics and as herbal treatments. Herbal distillates are less concentrated than essential oils, possibly making them more suitable for some topical uses.

Science 
The science of distillation is based on the fact that different substances vaporise at different temperatures. Unlike other extraction techniques based on solubility of a compound in either water or oil, distillation will separate components regardless of their solubility. The distillate will contain compounds that vaporize at or below the temperature of distillation. The actual chemical components of these orange herbal distillates have not yet been fully identified, but plant distillates will usually contain essential oil compounds as well as organic acids and other water-soluble plant components. Compounds with a higher vaporization point will remain behind and will include many of the water-soluble plant pigments and flavonoids.

Because hydrosols are produced at high temperatures and are somewhat acidic, they tend to inhibit bacterial growth but not fungal growth. They are not sterile, and should be kept refrigerated to preserve freshness. Herbal distillates degrade over time and will degrade faster than essential oils, which are more stable and will degrade slower. Small-scale producers of hydrosols must be particularly aware of the risk of bacterial contamination and take steps to prevent it. Despite concerns that there may be significant amounts of heavy metals in popular herbal distillates, this has not shown to be the case.

See also
Orange flower water
Rose water
Witch hazel (astringent)

References

Books
 Firth, Grace. Secrets of the Still. Epm Pubns Inc; First edition (June 1983)
 Price, Len and Price, Shirley. Understanding Hydrolats: The Specific Hydrosols for Aromatherapy: A Guide for Health Professional. Churchill Livingstone 2004
 Rose, Jeanne. 375 Essential Oils & Hydrosols. Frog, Ltd, Berkeley, CA, 1999.  
 Rose, Jeanne. Hydrosols & Aromatic Waters.  Institute of Aromatic & Herbal Study, 2007.

 
Distillation
Herbs
Essential oils
Flavor technology
Herbalism
Cosmetics
Perfume ingredients
Pharmacognosy